Páginas da Vida (English: Pages of Life) is a Brazilian telenovela produced and broadcast by Rede Globo from 10 July 2006 to 2 March 2007 in 203 episodes.

It stars Regina Duarte, Lília Cabral and Fernanda Vasconcellos in the lead roles.

Lília Cabral was nominated in 2007 for best actress in the International Emmy Awards for her role as Marta.

Premise 
The story is divided into two phases: the first occurs in 2001. This phase lasts for the first 38 episodes of the telenovela. The second phase takes place in the present (2006), showing the characters' lives five years after the death of Nanda, and life of the twins.

Cast

Reception

Ratings

References

External links
 

2006 Brazilian television series debuts
2007 Brazilian television series endings
2006 telenovelas
TV Globo telenovelas
Brazilian telenovelas
Brazilian LGBT-related television shows
Portuguese-language telenovelas